Isaac ben Moses can refer to:

 Isaac ben Moses of Vienna (c. 1200–70), Viennese rabbi
 Profiat Duran (c. 1350 – 1415) (Hebrew name Isaac ben Moses ha-Levi), physician and philosopher
 Isaac ben Moses Arama (1420–94), Spanish rabbi